Cotton is an Anglo-Saxon surname, derived from place names such as Coton, Cottam and Cotham, which in turn are named for the Old English word cot meaning cottage or hut, and as an (unrelated) French surname, from the diminutive of cotte, meaning coat of mail. Notable people with the surname include:

Athletes
Amy Cotton (born 1980), Canadian judoka
 Coby and Cory Cotton (born 1987), co-creators of Dude Perfect
Craig Cotton (born 1947), American football player
Fran Cotton (born 1947), rugby footballer of the 1970s and 1980s
Harold Cotton (cricketer) (1914–1966), Australian cricketer
Harold Cotton (ice hockey) (1902–1984), Canadian ice hockey player
Henry Cotton (golfer) (1907–1987), English golfer
James Cotton (basketball) (born 1975), American basketball player
James Cotton (gridiron football) (born 1978), American football player
Jeff Cotton (American football) (born 1997), American football player
Jharel Cotton (born 1992), American baseball player
Keith Cotton (born 1942), rugby footballer of the 1960s and 1970s
Lester Cotton (born 1996), American football player
Paris Cotton (born 1989), American football player
Schea Cotton (born 1978), American basketball player
Terry Cotton (born 1946), English footballer

Musicians
Billy Cotton (1899–1969), British band leader
Gene Cotton (born 1944), American pop and folk singer-songwriter
James Cotton (1935–2017), American blues harmonica player, singer, songwriter
Jeff Cotton (born 1949), American rock guitarist
Paul Cotton (1943–2021), American guitar player

Politicians and nobility
Dorothy Cotton (1930–2018), American civil rights activist
George W. Cotton (1821–1892), South Australian politician
Norris Cotton (1900–1989), American politician
Paul Cotton (diplomat) (born 1930), New Zealand diplomat
Robert Bell Cotton (1859–1917), American politician
The Cotton baronets
Tom Cotton (born 1977), American politician

Science and engineering
Aimé Cotton (1869–1951), French scientist
Cotton effect, named after Aimé Cotton
Cotton–Mouton effect, named after Aimé Cotton and Henri Mouton
Sir Arthur Cotton (1803–1899), British general and engineer famous for his work in India
Arthur Disbrowe Cotton (1879–1962), English plant pathologist, mycologist, phycologist, and botanist
Bernard Charles Cotton (1905–1966), Australian malacologist
Carl Cotton (1918–1971), American taxidermist
Charles Cotton (geologist) (1885–1970), New Zealand geologist
Émile Cotton (1872–1950), French mathematician, discoverer of the Cotton tensor
F. Albert Cotton (1930–2007), American inorganic chemist
Sir Robert Cotton, 1st Baronet, of Connington (1571–1631), antiquarian and bibliophile, creator of the basis of the British Library

Television
Antony Cotton (born 1975), British actor, best known for his roles in Coronation Street and Queer as Folk (UK)
Bill Cotton (1928–2008), British television executive
Fearne Cotton (born 1981), English television presenter and radio 1 DJ
Dot Cotton (Eastenders)

Other
Charles Cotton (1630–1687), poet
Charles Cotton (disambiguation), several people
David Cotton (born 1950/1951), American billionaire businessman
John Cotton (minister) (1585–1652), clergyman, grandfather of Cotton Mather
Mary Ann Cotton (1832–1873), British serial killer
Richard Lynch Cotton (1794–1880), British vicar and university administrator
Robert Cotton (disambiguation), several people
Sarah Cotton (1815–1878), British wife of the academic and medic Sir Henry Acland, inspiration for the Acland Hospital
Sir Sydney Cotton (1792–1874), British Army officer.
Thomas Cotton, several people
William Cotton (disambiguation), several people

See also
Cotton (disambiguation)
Cotton (nickname)
Coton (disambiguation)
Cotten

References

English-language surnames